South Hempstead is a hamlet and census-designated place (CDP) in the Town of Hempstead in Nassau County, on Long Island, in New York, United States. The population was 3,243 at the 2010 census.

History 
South Hempstead's name reflects its geographic location south of the Village of Hempstead.

Geography

Demographics

As of the census of 2000, there were 3,188 people, 1,044 households, and 842 families residing in the CDP. The population density was 5,441.1 per square mile (2,086.3/km2). There were 1,075 housing units at an average density of 1,834.7/sq mi (703.5/km2). The racial makeup of the CDP was 85.8% White, 5.1% African American, 0.1% Native American, 2.5% Asian, 3.5% from other races, and 2.0% from two or more races. Hispanic or Latino of any race were 5.5% of the population.

There were 1,044 households, out of which 39.9% had children under the age of 18 living with them, 65.8% were married couples living together, 11.6% had a female householder with no husband present, and 19.3% were non-families. 15.5% of all households were made up of individuals, and 8.0% had someone living alone who was 65 years of age or older. The average household size was 3.05 and the average family size was 3.40.

In the CDP, the population was spread out, with 27.1% under the age of 18, 6.5% from 18 to 24, 29.1% from 25 to 44, 24.1% from 45 to 64, and 13.2% who were 65 years of age or older. The median age was 38 years. For every 100 females, there were 93.6 males. For every 100 females age 18 and over, there were 90.3 males.

The median income for a household in the CDP was $85,130, and the median income for a family was $98,259. Males had a median income of $70,057 versus $55,599 for females. The per capita income for the CDP was $32,534. About 1.8% of families and 2.4% of the population were below the poverty line, including 0.7% of those under age 18 and 1.7% of those age 65 or over.

References

Hempstead, New York
Census-designated places in New York (state)
Hamlets in New York (state)
Census-designated places in Nassau County, New York
Hamlets in Nassau County, New York